Tulcus subfasciatus is a species of beetle in the family Cerambycidae. It was described by James Thomson in 1860. It is known from French Guiana.

References

subfasciatus
Beetles described in 1860